Dimethyl disulfide (DMDS) is an organic chemical compound with the molecular formula . It is a flammable liquid with an unpleasant, garlic-like odor.  The compound is colorless although impure samples often appear yellowish.

Occurrence and synthesis
Dimethyl disulfide is a widespread in nature. It emitted by bacteria, fungi, plants, and animals. 
Along with dimethyl sulfide and dimethyl trisulfide it has been confirmed as volatile compounds given off by the fly-attracting plant known as dead-horse arum (Helicodiceros muscivorus). These flies are attracted to the odor resembling that of fetid meat, and thus help pollinate this plant.

DMDS can be produced by the oxidation of methanethiol, e.g. with iodine:

Chemical reactions
Important reactions include chlorination giving methanesulfenyl chloride, methanesulfinyl chloride, and methanesulfonyl chloride as well as oxidation with hydrogen peroxide or peracetic acid giving the thiosulfinate methyl methanethiosulfinate.

Uses
DMDS is used as a food additive in onion, garlic, cheese, meats, soups, savory flavors, and fruit flavors. Industrially, DMDS is used in oil refineries as a sulfiding agent. DMDS is also an effective soil fumigant in agriculture, registered in many states in the U.S. as well as globally. In this capacity, DMDS is an important alternative in replacing methyl bromide, which is being phased out, however less effective than the former. This pesticide is marketed as "Paladin" by Arkema.

Industrial use
DMDS is used to prepare catalysts for hydrodesulfurization, because of its high sulfur content and low decomposition temperature. Refineries utilize DMDS instead of other sulfur spiking agents for catalyst sulfiding because it has more sulfur per pound than dimethyl sulfide (DMS) or di-tertiary-butyl polysulfide (TBPS). Once injected to a hydrotreater or hydrocracker, DMDS decomposes to form H2S. The H2S reacts with the metal oxides on the catalyst, converting them to the active metal sulfide form.

DMDS also works as an effective product for operators in the petrochemicals industry who must protect their steam-cracking coils against the formation of coke and carbon monoxide.

DMDS is utilized in the preparation of 4-(methylthio)phenol which is used in the production of various pesticides. DMDS and chlorine are reacted with borontrifluoride phenoxide to produce 4-(methylthio)phenol. Thiophene and DMDS are blended with combustible hydrocarbon fuel gas to impart a gassy odor to the fuel gas.

References
 Reactor Resources LLC

Organic disulfides
Foul-smelling chemicals